Willow-Jean Prime (née Downs; born 1983) is a New Zealand politician who was elected to the New Zealand Parliament at the 2017 general election as a list representative of the New Zealand Labour Party. At the 2020 election, she won the electorate of Northland by 163 votes, the closest election of the 2020 cycle.

Personal life
Prime is of Te Kapotai, Ngāti Hine and Ngāpuhi descent and grew up in Northland. Her father Barry (d. 2018) was a train driver; she learnt to drive a train before a car and wanted to follow her father's career but was advised at school that women could not drive trains. Prime played basketball at school and was offered a scholarship to play in the United States. Prime has a Master of Laws from Waikato University, focusing on recent developments in Treaty settlements, Māori governance and indigenous development. She also has a conjoint Bachelor of Arts and Bachelor of Laws and a post-graduate Diploma of Māori and Pacific Development with distinction. She has worked as a solicitor.

She lives near Pakaraka with her husband Dion, who is a teacher, and has two children. She was pregnant during both her 2015 and 2017 election campaigns.

Political career

Local government 
Prime began her political career when she was elected to the Far North District Council for Bay of Islands-Whangaroa in 2013; she was the youngest person on the council at age 30. She was re-elected for a second term in 2016.

Unsuccessful campaigns for Parliament 
She ran for the  electorate, placing second with 29% of the vote. She was placed 34th on Labour's party list for the election, which due to a poor result by Labour was not enough to enter Parliament.

She ran again for the Northland electorate in its by-election of 2015. The seat was strategically relevant as New Zealand First leader Winston Peters threatened to unseat the safe National position. Polls showed a close race between Peters and the National candidate, Mark Osborne, with Prime third on around 16 to 20% of the vote, but also that Peters would win if Prime withdrew from the race. Labour Party leader Andrew Little did not oppose strategic voting, saying, "We have a candidate in the race, and she's a good candidate, and she's somebody who we want in Parliament. I have a duty to back her. But in the end, I want Northlanders to exercise their choice, to see that they could make a difference here. If they want to send a message to the government that we are sick and tired of being neglected, then they know what their choice is." Ultimately, Peters won the by-election and Prime came third with 4.7% of the vote.

Election to Parliament 
Prime ran again in Northland at the 2017 general election. Labour placed her 16th on its party list, later moving her to 17th following a reshuffle. This high ranking almost guaranteed her entry to Parliament. On the initial list, Prime had the highest Labour rank for a Māori candidate, though after the reshuffle deputy leader Kelvin Davis was placed above her. Prime said she would resign her seat in the Far North District Council should she be elected to Parliament. Prime again did not win the Northland electorate, but entered parliament via the party list.

Following a cabinet reshuffle on 27 June 2019, Prime was appointed as the Parliamentary Private Secretary for Local Government.

Prime ran again in the 2020 general election, still contesting Northland but this time moved down to 36th on the Labour party list. Northland was again an important electorate; New Zealand First was polling poorly, but if its candidate Shane Jones could win Northland it would stay in Parliament. Unlike the 2015 by-election, Prime and Labour offered no support to New Zealand First in Northland. Prime would not tell Northlanders to vote for Jones, saying “The prime minister has been clear that we haven’t made those sorts of deals before and we won’t now.” While preliminary results indicated she had again lost the Northland electorate to the National candidate Matt King, the final count released on 6 November gave her a victory with a majority of 163 votes. King initially said that he would request a recount, but the next day changed his mind as he had concluded that there was little chance of overturning the result.

Following the 2020 election, Prime was appointed as Labour's assistant whip on 2 November. In a cabinet reshuffle by Prime Minister Chris Hipkins on 31 January 2023 Prime was appointed a minister for Conservation, Youth, Associate Arts, Culture and Heritage, Associate Health.

References

External links
 

1983 births
Living people
New Zealand Labour Party MPs
Members of the New Zealand House of Representatives
21st-century New Zealand women politicians
New Zealand list MPs
Women members of the New Zealand House of Representatives
University of Waikato alumni
Māori politicians
Unsuccessful candidates in the 2014 New Zealand general election
Candidates in the 2017 New Zealand general election
Candidates in the 2020 New Zealand general election
New Zealand MPs for North Island electorates
Ngāti Hine people
Ngāpuhi people
Government ministers of New Zealand
Women government ministers of New Zealand